Slezská Harta Reservoir is an artificial reservoir and a rock-fill embankment dam in the Nízký Jeseník mountain range, Moravian-Silesian Region, Czech Republic. The dam is built on the upper course of the Moravice River. With the surface area of 8.7 km², it is one of the largest reservoirs in the country. It was constructed in 1987–1997.

During the construction parts of six villages were demolished and subsequently flooded. The village of Karlovec was completely flooded and ceased to exist. Today only Church of Saint John of Nepomuk and several other abandoned buildings remain at the reservoir's shore. Villages of Dlouhá Stráň, Nová Pláň, Razová, Roudno and Leskovec nad Moravicí were also partially flooded and are today located on the shore of the reservoir.

The main use of the reservoir is to supply enough water in case of unfavorable conditions to the Kružberk reservoir, which supplies drinking water for the Ostrava agglomeration, and is located downstream on the Moravice River. It is also used to supply process water to the nearby towns and villages, generate electricity and subdue floods on the Moravice.

References

External links

Entry at Odra Basin website 

Dams in the Czech Republic
Reservoirs in the Czech Republic
Bruntál District
Buildings and structures in the Moravian-Silesian Region
Dams completed in 1998